Ludmiła Marjańska (26 December 1923 – 2005) was a Polish poet and translator.

She was born Ludmiła Mężnicka on 26 December 1923 in Częstochowa. She married in 1945. She published her first poems in 1953. She studied English philology at the University of Warsaw. She published some poetic books, like Chmurne okna, W koronie drzewa, Blizna, Zmrożone światło, Prześwit, Stare lustro, Żywica, Córka bednarza. She translated poems by, among others, Elizabeth Barrett Browning, Emily Dickinson and Robert Burns.

References 

Polish poets
Polish translators
1923 births
2005 deaths
Polish women poets
20th-century translators
Recipient of the Meritorious Activist of Culture badge